Alfred Farrer Smith (7 March 1847 – 6 January 1915) was an English first-class cricketer, who played twenty eight  matches for Yorkshire County Cricket Club from 1868 to 1874, and one game for the Players of the North in 1874.

Born in Birstall, Yorkshire, England, Smith was a right-handed batsman, who scored 796 runs at 16.93.  He never made a first-class century, but came close with an innings of 99 against the Gentlemen of the South.  He scored three half centuries in all, including  89 against Nottinghamshire and 51 against Middlesex, and took eleven catches in the field.  His right arm fast medium round arm bowling was not called upon in first-class games.

Smith died on January 6, 1915, in Ossett, Yorkshire.

References

External links
Cricinfo Profile
Cricket Archive Statistics

1847 births
1915 deaths
Yorkshire cricketers
People from Birstall, West Yorkshire
English cricketers
Cricketers from Yorkshire
Players of the North cricketers